Jane's Airport Review (part of Jane's Information Group) is recognised by the airport and air traffic control industries as a source for reporting on global market developments. The magazine was established in 2011, and is published eight times a year. The headquarters is in Coulsdon, Greater London.

The review includes business news and analysis covering airport infrastructure, aviation security, air traffic control and airspace management, ramp handling, and terminal and ground support equipment. Reports cover editorial briefings, policy issues, market analysis, finance and new product development, as well as profiles on individual companies.

In June 2015, the circulation of Jane's Airport Review was 11,379 copies.

References

External links
 

Aviation magazines
Business magazines published in the United Kingdom
Eight times annually magazines published in the United Kingdom
Magazines established in 2011
Mass media in Surrey